Avinash Chander  is an Indian politician and belongs to the ruling Shiromani Akali Dal. He is a member of Punjab Legislative Assembly and represents Phillaur. He is also the chief parliamentary secretary for Higher Education & Languages department.

Family
His father's name is Mool Raj. His grandfather's name is Seth Kishan Dass.

Political career
Chander was first elected to Punjab Legislative Assembly from Kartarpur in 2007. In 2012, he successfully contested from the new constituency Phillaur.

References

Living people
Punjab, India MLAs 2012–2017
Year of birth missing (living people)
Place of birth missing (living people)
Shiromani Akali Dal politicians
People from Jalandhar district
Punjab, India MLAs 2007–2012